Integral yoga, sometimes also called  supramental yoga, is the yoga-based philosophy and practice of Sri Aurobindo and  The Mother (Mirra Alfassa). Central to Integral yoga is the idea that Spirit manifests itself in a process of involution, meanwhile forgetting its origins. The reverse process of evolution is driven toward a complete manifestation of spirit.

According to Sri Aurobindo, the current status of human evolution is an intermediate stage in the evolution of being, which is on its way to the unfolding of the spirit, and the self-revelation of divinity in all things. Yoga is a rapid and concentrated evolution of being, which can take effect in one life-time, while unassisted natural evolution would take many centuries or many births. Aurobindo suggests a grand program called sapta chatushtaya (seven quadrates) to aid this evolution.

Worldview

Spirit - Satchitananda

Spirit or satchitananda is the Absolute, the source of all that exists. It is the One, having three aspects: Sat (truth), Citta (consciousness, awareness), and ananda (bliss, happiness).

Involution

Involution is the extension of Spirit, the Absolute, to create a universe of separate forms. Being manifests itself as a multiplicity of forms, meanwhile becoming lost in the inconscience of matter. The first manifestation of Spirit in the process of involution is as Satchitananda, and then as Supermind, the intermediate link between the higher (Spirit) and lower (matter, life, and mind) nature.

According to Aurobindo the world is a differentiated unity. It is a manifold oneness, that generates an infinite variety of lifeforms and substances. The lifeforms and substances are stretched out on a wide range, from physical matter to a pure form of spiritual being, akin to the five koshas or sheaths, where the subject becomes fully aware of itself as spirit:  
 Material: a submerged consciousness concealed in its action and losing itself in the form.
 Vital: an emerging consciousness, a consciousness half delivered out of its original imprisonment which has become of vital craving and satisfaction or repulsion.
 Mental: an emerged consciousness reflecting fact of life in a mental sense, perceptive and ideative. It modifies the internal and attempts to modify conformably the external existence of the being.

Above Mind proper lie various higher levels of Mind, which ascend toward Spirit.

Evolution 
Through evolution Spirit rediscovered itself as Spirit. Evolution follows a developmental trajectory from the original inconscience of matter into life, to mind, and then to spiritualized mind, culminating in The Supermind or Truth Consciousness. Evolution is teleological, since the developing entity contains within itself already the totality toward which it develops. It is not a mechanistic or deterministic teleology, but a "manifestation of all the possibilities inherent in the total movement."

The goal of integral yoga 
The goal of Integral yoga is to become aware of the Divine, to integrate the physical, mental and spiritual aspects of ourselves, and to manifest the Divine at earth. According to Sri Aurobindo, all life is Yoga, while Yoga as a sadhana is a methodised effort towards self-perfection, which brings to expression the latent, hidden potentialities of being. Success in this effort unifies the human individual with the universal and transcendental Existence. Integral yoga reunites "the infinite in the finite, the timeless in the temporal and the transcendent with the immanent.

Three types of being 
Sri Aurobindo discerns three types of being: the Outer being, the Inner being, and the Psychic Being.

The Outer Being
The Outer Being includes the physical, vital and mental levels of Being, which characterises our everyday consciousness and experience. This includes several levels of the subconscient: a mental subconscient, a vital subconscient, and a physical subconscient, down to the material Inconscient. Integral Yoga involves going beyond this surface consciousness to the larger life of the Inner Being, which is more open to spiritual realisation.

The Inner or Subliminal Being
The Inner Being, or Subliminal, includes the inner realms or aspects of the physical, vital and mental being. They have a larger, subtler, freer consciousness than that of the everyday consciousness. Its realisation is essential for any higher spiritual realisation.

The Inner Being is also transitional between the surface or Outer Being and the Psychic or Inmost Being. By doing yoga practice (sadhana), the inner consciousness is being opened, and life turns away from the outward to the inward. The inner consciousness becomes more real than the outer consciousness, and becomes a peace, happiness and closeness to the Divine.

The Psychic Being
The Psychic Being is Sri Aurobindo's term for the Personal Evolving Soul (the Higher Mind, Illumined Mind, Intuition and Overmind), the principle of Divine spirit in every individual. The Psychic is the "Innermost Being", the permanent being in us that stands behind and supports the physical, vital and mental principles. It "uses mind, life and body as its instruments," undergoing their fate yet also transcending them.

In Integral Yoga the goal is to move inward and discover the Psychic Being, which then can bring about a transformation of the outer nature. This transformation of the outer being or ego by the Psychic is called Psychicisation; it is one of the three necessary stages in the realisation of the Supramental consciousness. This Psychic transformation is the decisive movement that enables a never-ending progress in life, through the power of connecting to one's inner spirit or Divine Essence. The Psychic begins its evolution completely veiled and hidden, but grows through successive lifetimes, and gradually exerts a greater influence, taking on the role of spiritual Guide.

Central being
Central Being refers to the transcendent and eternal spirit, as opposed to the incarnate and evolving Soul, which he calls the Psychic Being. Sometimes it refers to both of them together as the essential spiritual core of the being. The Central Being "presides over the different births one after the other but is itself unborn" (ibid p. 269). This transcendent Central Being or Spirit is also designated as the Jiva or Jivatman, although the meaning of these terms in Sri Aurobindo's philosophy differs greatly from that of much of conventional Vedanta (especially Advaita Vedanta)

Levels of being

The levels of being ascend from the inconscient to the Supermind.

Inconscient
Inconscient Matter is the lowest level of involution. Spirit is still present in the inconscient: "The Inconscient is the Superconscient's sleep." The Inconscient is also the instrument of the Superconsciousness which has created the Universe. According to Satprem, the Inconscient lies at the bottom of the physical subconscient, and "life emerged ... at the border between the material inconscient and the physical consciousness ... in our body.

Subconscient and subtle or subliminal conscient
The physical, vital and mental levels of being contain both a subconscient and a subtle or subliminal part.

The subconscient
The subconscient parts are the submerged parts. It contains "obstinate samskaras, impressions, associations, fixed notions, habitual reactions formed by the past." According to Satprem, there are several levels of the subconscient, corresponding with the different levels of our being: a mental subconscient, a vital subconscient, and a physical subconscient, down to the material Inconscient.

According to Aurobindo, the body is partly a creation of the inconscient or subconscient. According to The Mother, the ordinary, false consciousness, which is common to material body-consciousness, is derived from the subconscient and the inconscient. According to Aurobindo, the outer being depends on the subconscient, which hinders the spiritual progress. Only by living in the inner being can this obstacle be overcome.

According to Sharma, the subconscient is "the inconscient in the process of becoming conscient." It is a submerged part of the personality without waking consciousness, but which does receive impressions, and influences the conscious mind. According to Sharma, it includes the unconscious mind which is described by psychologists like Sigmund Freud and Carl Jung, though it includes much more than the unconscious of (Freudian) psychology.

The subtle or subliminal conscient
The subtle or subliminal is the subtle, higher counterpart of the subconscient. According to Sharma, "it has an inner mind, an inner vital being, and an inner subtle physical being, wider than man's consciousness." It can directly experience the Universal, and "it is the source of inspirations, intuitions, ideas, will ... as well as ... telepathy [and] clearvoyance."

Gross body 
The gross body commonly referred to in yoga constitutes mainly of two parts the material physical body (annakosha) and the nervous system normally refer to as vital vehicle (Prana kosha) in Integral yoga.

Physical
The Physical level refers to both the physical body and the body's consciousness. The body is just as conscious as the vital and mental parts of the being, only it is a different type of consciousness. The Physical not only shades upwards to higher ontological levels, but also downwards into the Subconscient.

The Subtle physical is Sri Aurobindo's term for a subtler aspect of the physical nature. This has many qualities not found in the gross physical nature.  In The Agenda, The Mother often refers to it. It might be compared to the etheric body and plane, or even the astral body and plane. The term "subtle physical" is used to distinguish it from gross (sthula) or outer material physical.

Vital
The Vital level of the being refers to the life force, but also to the various passions, desires, feelings, emotions, affects, compulsions, and likes and dislikes. These strongly determine human motivation and action through desire and enthusiasm.

Unlike Western psychology, in which mind, emotions, instincts, and consciousness are all lumped together, Sri Aurobindo strongly distinguishes between the "Vital" and the "Mental" faculties.

In addition to the individual Vital faculty, Sri Aurobindo refers to a Vital Plane or Vital world, which would seem to be partly equivalent to the Astral Plane of popular occultism and New Age thought.

Mind or Mental being

Mind proper is the conceptual and cognitive mind, the manakosha. Mind is a subordinate process of the Supermind. It is the intermediary stage between the Divine and the mundane life. It works by measuring and dividing reality, and has lost sight of the Divine. It is the seat of ignorance, yet it is still capable of an upward ascent toward the Divine.

Unlike Western psychology, in which mind and consciousness are considered the same, Sri Aurobindo strongly distinguishes between the "Mental" and the "Vital" (emotional) faculties, as well as between Mind and pure Consciousness. Sri Aurobindo in part bases his concept of the Mental on his reading of the Taittiriya Upanishad, the mental being (or perhaps just the Mental Purusha) is the mano-maya-atma – the self made of mind (manas).

For Sri Aurobindo, Mind or the Mental being is not simple and uniform, but consists itself of various strata and subdivisions, which act at different levels of being. These various faculties are described or variously referred to, usually in obliquely or in passing, in some of his books, including Savitri, which has poetic references to many types of Mind. In his letters answering questions from disciples, Sri Aurobindo summarises the characteristics of the various levels of Mind.

Spiritual Being
Above mind proper lie various higher individual levels of mind, namely the Higher Mind, Illumined Mind, Intuitive Mind and Overmind, which ascend toward the Spirit, and provide a higher and more inclusive vision of reality:
 Higher Mind is the realm of Truth-thought. It can hold a wide range of knowledge in one vision and an integral whole. It receives illumination from the Illumined Mind, and is not dependent on the limited knowledge of the senses. It is also capable of transforming the lower realms of body and mind, effectuating changes of habit and life. Nevertheless, it is still a state of thought, in contrast to Illumined Mind, which is a state of vision and spiritual insight.
 Illumined Mind is the mind of sight and vision. It transforms the Higher Mind by providing it a direct vision.
 Intuition provides the illumination of thought and vision to the Higher Mind and the Illumined Mind. Mundane mind may experience intuition too, but in the higher realms of mind it becomes more frequent and stable.
 Overmind is the Cosmic Consciousness. It is the plane of Gods. Overmental plane is the highest consciousness one can achieve without transcending the mental system. Beyond overmind are the planes of Supermind or unity-consciousness.

Supermind

Supermind is the infinite unitary Truth Consciousness or Truth-Idea beyond the three lower planes of Matter, Life, and Mind. Supermind is the dynamic form of Sachchidananda (Being-Consciousness-Bliss), and the necessary mediator or link between the transcendent Sacchidananda and the creation.

Limitations of the present being
Humans are stuck between matter and Spirit, due to the habits of personality and partial awareness, which arise from Ignorance.

Personality  
Humans are accustomed to respond to certain vibrations more than other. These customs develop into one's desire, pain, feelings, which are all a set of habits. This crystallised set of habits becomes one's personality. This is normally believed to be "self". The appearance of stable personality is given by constant repetition and recurrence of the same vibrations and formations.

Three basic difficulties for mankind
According to Aurobindo, humans face three basic problems:
 Partial Self-awareness: humans are only aware of a small part about themselves. They are aware of the surface of mentality, physical being, and life, and not of the larger and more potent subconscious mind and hidden life impulses. 
 Partial awareness of other beings: humans create a rough mental construction of their fellow beings. Their understanding is created by a mental knowledge, which is imperfect, and subjected to denial and frustration. This partial awareness can be overcome by a conscious unity. This unity can only be achieved from Supermind.
 A division between Force and consciousness in evolution: matter, life and mind are often warring with each other. Materialists try to resolve this war by submitting oneself to the mortality of our being, while ascetics have tried to reject earthly life. A true solution may lie in finding the principle beyond mind, thereby overcoming the mortality of our existence.

Ignorance
The fundamental cause of falsehood, error and evil is Ignorance. Ignorance is a self-limiting knowledge, which arises with exclusive concentration in a single field. According to Aurobindo, human notion of good, bad & evil are uncertain and relative.

Practices
Unlike other Yoga practices Integral yoga does not propose any kind of physical asanas, breathing techniques or external movements. It is more psychological in nature, with internal reflection and self analysis & correction as main tools of development .

The main practices or approaches are divided into 
  The yoga of divine work (yoga through one's work)
  The yoga of Integral Knowledge (Yoga through analysis, observation and knowledge)
  The Yoga of Divine love (Commonly referred to as Bhakti yoga or love of god)  
  The Yoga of Self-Perfection (referred to as a Synthetic yoga or the triple way)

The Yoga of Self-Perfection

The Triple Transformation
The limitations of the present being can be overcome by the Triple transformation, the process in which the lower nature is transformed into the divine nature. It consists of the inward psychicisation by which the sadhak gets in contact with the inner divine principle or Psychic Being; the spiritual transformation or spiritualisation; and the Supramentalisation of the entire being.

Psychicisation
Psychicisation is a turn inward, so that one realises the psychic being, the psychic personality or Divine Soul, in the core of one's being. The Divine Soul serves as a spiritual Guide in the yoga, and enables one to transform the outer being. It may also help avoid the dangers of the spiritual path. There is an intermediate zone, a dangerous and misleading transitional spiritual and pseudospiritual region between the ordinary consciousness and true spiritual realisation.

Psychisiation consists of three methods. In "consecration" one opens oneself to the Force before engaging in an activity. "Moving to the Depths" (or "concentration") is a movement away from the surface existence to a deeper existence within. "Surrender" means offering all one's work, one's life to the Divine Force and Intent. Guided by the evolving divine soul within, the sadhak moves away from ego, ignorance, finiteness, and the limitations of the outer being. It is thanks to this guidance by the Divine Soul that the sadhak can avoid the pitfalls of the spiritual path.

Spiritualisation
As a result of the Psychicisation, light, peace, and power descend into the body, transforming all of its parts, physical, vital, and mental. This is the Spiritual transformation, or Spiritualisation, the concretisation of the larger spiritual consciousness. It is equivalent to "enlightenment", as found in Vedanta and Buddhism.

Intermediate zone

Aurobindo asserted that spiritual aspirants may pass through an intermediate zone where experiences of force, inspiration, illumination, light, joy, expansion, power, and freedom from normal limits are possible. These can become associated with personal aspirations, ambitions, notions of spiritual fulfilment and yogic siddhi, and even be falsely interpreted as full spiritual realisation. One can pass through this zone, and the associated spiritual dangers, without harm by perceiving its real nature, and seeing through the misleading experiences. Those who go astray in it may end in a spiritual disaster, or may remain stuck there and adopt some half-truth as the whole truth, or become an instrument of lesser powers of these transitional planes. According to Aurobindo, this happens to many sadhaks and yogis.

Supramentalisation
Supramentalisation is the realisation of the Supermind, or Supramental consciousness, and the resulting transformation of the entire being. Psychicisation and spiritualisation serve as necessary prerequisites for the Supramentalisation of the entire being.

The supramental transformation is the final stage in the integral yoga, enabling the birth of a new individual, fully formed by the supramental power. Such individuals would be the forerunners of a new supra-humanity, grounded in truth-consciousness. All aspects of division and ignorance of consciousness, at the vital and mental levels, would be overcome, and replaced with a unity of consciousness at every plane. And even the physical body transformed and divinised. A new supramental species would then emerge, living a supramental, gnostic, divine life on earth.

Aurobindo describes several results and different stages depicting the stages of development in integral yoga, called together the sapta chatushtaya, "seven quadrates." It consists of:.
 Shanti (peace, calm), which consists of samatha (calming of the mind), shanti (peace), sukha (happiness), and hasya (Atmaprasada, contentment of the Atman);
 Shakti (power), which consists of shakti (the power of the primordial energy), virya (energy, effort), daivi prakriti (Divine Nature, primal force), and sraddha (faith);
 vijnana (knowledge), which consists of jnanam (knowledge), trikaladrsti (knowledge of past, present and future), ashtasiddhi (eight powers), and samadhi (absorption);
 Sharira (body), which consists of arogyam (health), utthapana (levitation, being free from gravity and physical powers), saundaryam (beauty), vividhananda (bliss);
 Karma (divine work), which consists of Krishna (avatar of Vishnu), Kali (the Goddess), kama (divine delight), and Karma (divine action;
 Brahma, the realization of Brahman; 
 Siddhi (realization), which consists of shuddhi (purification), mukti (liberation), bhukti (enjoyment), and siddhi (realisation of yogic powers).

Influence
Aurobindo had a strong influence on Ken Wilber's integral theory of spiritual development. Wilber's Causal and Ultimate stages closely resemble Aurobindo's higher mental stages, but Wilber lumps together levels of Being, types of Being and developmental stages.

See also
 Neo-Vedanta

Notes

References

Sources

Printed sources
Sri Aurobindo
 
 

 
 

The Mother
 
 
 The Mother (1980), Words of the Mother, Collected Works of the Mother, Centenary Edition vol.13, Sri Aurobindo Ashram Trust, Pondicherry

Other sources

Web-sources

Further reading
 Sen, Indra (1986) Integral Psychology: The Psychological System of Sri Aurobindo, Pondicherry, India: Sri Aurobindo Ashram Trust

External links

 Integral Yoga of Sri Aurobindo & The Mother
 Glossary to the Record of Yoga
 Rod Hemsell, Ken Wilber and Sri Aurobindo: A Critical Perspective

Sri Aurobindo
Integral thought
Modern Denominational Yoga
Yoga styles
Religious belief and doctrine
Neo-Vedanta